John H. Postlethwait is a professor of biology and author at University of Oregon.

Education 
In 1966, Postlethwait graduated from Purdue University with a bachelor's degree in biology and was inducted into Phi Beta Kappa. He completed predoctoral work in development genetics at University of California, Irvine in 1970. At Case Western Reserve University, Postlethwait earned a doctorate in developmental genetics before completing postdoctoral research in molecular genetics at Harvard University.

Career 
Postlethwait is internationally recognized for his pioneering work on molecular genetics using zebrafish (Danio rerio) as a model organism.

Awards 
Postlethwait was awarded the George W. Beadle Award in 2015.

References

External links 
 John Postlethwait's homepage
 John Postlethwait's Google Scholar page
 CV from the University of Oregon
 Postlethwait Zebrafish Genetics Laboratory
 

Living people
Purdue University alumni
Case Western Reserve University alumni
University of Oregon faculty
Year of birth missing (living people)